Belgium participated at the 2018 Summer Youth Olympics in Buenos Aires, Argentina from 6 October to 18 October 2018.

Medalists

Medals awarded to participants of mixed-NOC teams are represented in italics. These medals are not counted towards the individual NOC medal tally.

Archery 

Belgium qualified one archer based on its performance at the 2018 European Youth Championships.

Individual

Team

Athletics 

Boys
Track & road events

Girls
Track & road events

Field events

Badminton 

Belgium qualified one player based on the Badminton Junior World Rankings.

Singles

Teams

Basketball 

Belgium qualified a boys' team based on its performance at the 2017 FIBA 3x3 U18 World Cup.

Boys

Skills Competition

Breaking 

Singles

Team

Canoeing 

Belgium qualified one boat based on its performance at the 2018 World Qualification Event.

Boys

Equestrian 

Belgium qualified a rider based on its performance at the FEI European Junior Jumping Championships.

 Individual Jumping – 1 athlete

Fencing 

Belgium qualified one athlete based on its performance at the 2018 Cadet World Championship.

 Girls' Épée – Axelle Wasiak

Golf

Individual

Team

Gymnastics

Artistic 
Belgium qualified one gymnast based on its performance at the 2018 European Junior Championship.

Boys

Multidiscipline

Judo

Individual

Team

Karate 

Belgium qualified one athlete based on its performance at one of the Karate Qualification Tournaments.

 Boys' −68 kg – Quentin Mahauden

Roller speed skating 

Boys

Rowing 

Belgium qualified one boat based on its performance at the 2017 World Junior Rowing Championships.

Girls'

Qualification Legend: FA=Final A (medal); FB=Final B (non-medal); FC=Final C (non-medal); FD=Final D (non-medal); SA/B=Semifinals A/B; SC/D=Semifinals C/D; R=Repechage

Sailing 

Belgium qualified one boat based on its performance at the 2018 Nacra 15 World Championships.

 Mixed Nacra 15 – 1 boat

Shooting

Individual

Team

Sport climbing 

Boys

Taekwondo

 1 Quota - Boys −73 kg

Tennis 

Singles

Doubles

Triathlon 

Belgium qualified two athletes based on its performance at the 2018 European Youth Olympic Games Qualifier.

Individual

Relay

References 

Youth Olympics
Nations at the 2018 Summer Youth Olympics
Belgium at the Youth Olympics